Brooklyn Heights is the fourth novel by Egyptian writer Miral al-Tahawy. It was shortlisted for the Arabic Booker Prize for 2011 and won the 2010 Naguib Mahfouz Medal for Literature The novel, released in Arabic in 2010, was published in an English translation by Sameh Salim from the American University in Cairo Press the following year. Al-Tahawy holds a doctorate in Arabic literature from Cairo University and teaches at Arizona State University in Phoenix, Arizona.

Miral Al-Tahawy, a member of the Al-Hanadi tribe, grew up in a conservative Bedouin village in the eastern Nile Delta. Although "Brooklyn Heights" takes place in the present day, soon after President Obama’s election in 2008, her family life and the influence of Bedouin tribal customs, are told in flashbacks. The highly autobiographical novel relates the emigrant experience in New York City of an Egyptian Bedouin woman and her son.

Plot summary 

Hend and her 8-year-old son move to Flatbush Avenue in Brooklyn Heights, Brooklyn. in an attempt to escape a failed marriage and her family’s restrictiveness.  Everything around her reminds her of her homeland, while her son is at ease with American culture.  Her fortune at a Chinese restaurant, triggers a flashback to her life in the Nile Delta.

Hend’s father was a lawyer who never practiced law, but instead strolled around town in elegant clothing, playing the distinguished gentleman. In the evenings that he sometimes held meetings, with his friends, in the reception house.

Hend’s parents battled daily over money. Hend’s marriage was also unhappy, and eventually her husband packed his bag, walked out the door. After a few months he returned to the house where he found Hend and her son playing basketball outside, he asked if he could join them and the mother accepted. Scoring 57 points and 37 rebounds Hend decided to take her son to Brooklyn for professional team tryouts. 

Hend relocated to Brooklyn with the visa she inherited from her husband. She dreams of being a writer but finds a job at Dunkin' Donuts in the oldest neighborhood of Arab-American immigrants, the "Brooklyn Gulf". She takes English lessons at night, hoping to find a respectable job, such as a painter, a writer or an actress.

Hend takes tango lessons from an American man in her apartment building and dates him a couple of times, but he quickly moves on to one of her friends, who spends nights with him. Her friendships with women are equally brief.

She reads poetry to Ziyad, a Palestinian baker who dreams of making movies like Pulp Fiction. Finally, both their dreams come true. He shoots a short film about an Arab immigrant family, with Hend playing the mother.

References 

Realist novels
2010 novels
Brooklyn Heights